Caroline, Princess of Wales may refer to:

Caroline of Ansbach, wife of King George II of Great Britain, who was Princess of Wales 1714–1727
Caroline of Brunswick, wife of King George IV of the United Kingdom, who was Princess of Wales 1795–1820